Rhopalia is a genus of mydas flies in the family Mydidae. There are about 13 described species in Rhopalia.

Species
These 13 species belong to the genus Rhopalia:

 Rhopalia annulata Sack, 1934 c g
 Rhopalia bequaerti Lyneborg, 1970 c g
 Rhopalia berlandi Seguy, 1949 c g
 Rhopalia cincta Sack, 1934 c g
 Rhopalia efflatouni Bequaert, 1961 c g
 Rhopalia gyps Bowden, 1987 c g
 Rhopalia iranensis Bequaert, 1961 c g
 Rhopalia mirandai Andretta & Carrera, 1951 c g
 Rhopalia oldroydi Lyneborg, 1970 c g
 Rhopalia olivieri Macquart, 1838 c g
 Rhopalia perarmata Seguy, 1941 c g
 Rhopalia spinolae Macquart, 1838 c g
 Rhopalia tristis Seguy, 1928 c g

Data sources: i = ITIS, c = Catalogue of Life, g = GBIF, b = Bugguide.net

References

Further reading

External links

 
 

Mydidae
Asiloidea genera